Mike Brown (born December 8, 1968) is an American former professional tennis player.

Brown, a native of Florida, is the younger brother of tennis players Jimmy and Ricky. 

As a collegiate tennis player for the University of Arkansas, Brown was a three-time All-American and twice won the Southwest Conference singles championship. He made the ITA All-American final in 1988 and attained the top singles ranking in 1989.

While competing on the professional tour, Brown's best performance was a quarter-final run at the 1989 Livingston Open, which included a win over sixth seed Kelly Evernden.

References

External links
 
 

1968 births
Living people
American male tennis players
Arkansas Razorbacks men's tennis players
Tennis people from Florida
People from Hialeah, Florida